This is a list of military communications ('Signals') units and formations of the Royal Air Force.

In the Royal Air Force sense, wings, groups, and commands can be considered formations. A formation is defined by the US Department of Defense as "two or more aircraft, ships, or units proceeding together under a commander". "Formations are those military organisations which are formed from different speciality Arms and Services troop units to create a balanced, combined combat force."

Higher level communications formations in the Royal Air Force included RAF Signals Command, which was later reduced to group status and incorporated into RAF Strike Command. Nos 26 and No. 60 Group RAF were established in the 1940s. No. 26 Group was reformed on 12 February 1940 within RAF Training Command, and transferred to RAF Technical Training Command on 27 May 1940. It was transferred to RAF Bomber Command on 10 February 1942, and then amalgamated with No. 60 (Signals) Group to form No. 90 (Signals) Group RAF on 25 April 1946.

The Radio Warfare Establishment (RWE) was established 21 July 1945 at RAF Swanton Morley, and later became the Central Signals Establishment (CSE). The CSE was formed 1 September 1946 at RAF Watton, equipped with Dominie and Tiger Moth, and disbanded there on 1 July 1965. When the establishment disbanded, the Research Wing and civilian parts of the "..Installation Squadron became the RAF Signals Command Air Radio Laboratories, and the training and service elements of Installation Squadron became the EW Support Wing." Many files regarding the CSE are accessible in the National Archives at Kew .

Radio units and formations

Radio Establishment

Radio Schools

Radio Flights

Signals units and formations

Wings

Squadrons

Units

Schools

Calibration units and formations

References

Citations

Bibliography

United Kingdom
RAF
Lists of Commonwealth air force units
 
 
RAF